Brian Heenan (born 4 August 1937) is a retired Australian Roman Catholic bishop.

Ordained to the priesthood on 29 June 1962, Heenan was named bishop of the Roman Catholic Diocese of Rockhampton, Australia in 1991 and retired on 1 October 2013.

References 

1937 births
Living people
People from Queensland
Roman Catholic bishops of Rockhampton